John Elliott Pillsbury (15 December 1846 – 30 December 1919) was a Rear Admiral in the United States Navy.

Biography
Born in Lowell, Massachusetts, Pillsbury was appointed midshipman in 1862 and commissioned an ensign in 1868. After serving on various stations afloat and ashore, he commanded the coast steamer Blake from 1884 to 1891 and did excellent scientific work, using some of his research instruments of his own invention. In the Spanish–American War, he commanded the dynamite cruiser , operating around the island of Cuba and in the vicinity of Morro Castle. In 1905 he served as Chief of Staff of the North Atlantic Fleet and in 1908–09, was Chief of the Bureau of Navigation.  In 1908 he was the first recipient of the West Indies Campaign Medal.

Although Rear Admiral Pillsbury's attainments as a sailor and a fighting man were noteworthy, he is perhaps best known as having been one of the world's foremost geographers and an authority on the Gulf Stream. Actively identified with the National Geographic Society for many years, he was president of the society at the time of his death. He was buried in Arlington National Cemetery; his wife Florence was buried with him after her death in 1925.

Namesakes
Two U.S. Navy ships have been christened  in his honor. Pillsbury Sound, the body of water in the U.S. Virgin Islands between St Thomas, St John, and the cays which bound the sound on the North side, is also named in his honor.

Gallery

References

 

1846 births
1919 deaths
American military personnel of the Spanish–American War
Burials at Arlington National Cemetery
National Geographic Society
People from Lowell, Massachusetts
Military personnel from Massachusetts
United States Navy admirals